"You are Mine" is a song written by Bob Marcucci and Peter De Angelis and performed by Frankie Avalon. The song reached #7 on the adult contemporary chart and #26 on the Billboard Top 100 in 1962.

The song was produced and arranged by Don Costa.

Other versions
Buddy Greco originally released a version as a single in August 1957.

References

1957 songs
1957 singles
1962 singles
Songs written by Bob Marcucci
Frankie Avalon songs
Chancellor Records singles
Songs written by Peter De Angelis